The Canton of Vesoul-2 (before March 2015: Vesoul-Est) is a French administrative division, in the arrondissement of Vesoul, in Haute-Saône département (Bourgogne-Franche-Comté région). It consists of the eastern part of the commune of Vesoul and its eastern suburbs. It has 16,072 inhabitants as of 2017.

Composition 
The canton of Vesoul-2 is composed of 13 communes:

Colombier
Comberjon
Coulevon
Frotey-lès-Vesoul
Montcey
Navenne
Quincey
Varogne
Vellefrie
Vesoul (partly)
La Villeneuve-Bellenoye-et-la-Maize
Villeparois
Vilory

See also
Cantons of the Haute-Saône department
Communes of the Haute-Saône department

References

Vesoul
Cantons of Haute-Saône